"There Was an Old Lady Who Swallowed a Fly" (alternatively "There Was an Old Lady", "I Know an Old Lady Who Swallowed a Fly", "There Was an Old Woman Who Swallowed a Fly" and "I Know an Old Woman Who Swallowed a Fly")  is a children's rhyme and nonsense song of a kind known as cumulative.

The song tells the nonsensical story of an old woman who swallows increasingly large animals, each to catch the previously swallowed animal, but dies after swallowing a horse. There are many variations of phrasing in the lyrics, especially for the description of swallowing each animal. 

An early documentation of the story appears in English author Dorothy B. King's 1946 book Happy Recollections. 

Shortly afterwards, the journal Hoosier Folklore published three versions of the story from different parts of the United States (Colorado, Georgia and Ohio) in its December 1947 edition. The editor calls it a "cumulative tale", and asks readers for information on its origins. All three versions begin with a lady swallowing the fly and end with her dying after swallowing a horse, but there are variations in what animals are swallowed and the rhymes for each animal.

In 1952, Rose Bonne (lyrics) and Canadian/English folk artist Alan Mills copyrighted a version of the song, respectively contributing lyrics and music. At that time it was entitled simply "I Know an Old Lady." A widely distributed version of the song was released on Brunswick Records in 1953, where it was sung by Burl Ives.  Ives' rendition appears on his album, Folk Songs, Dramatic and Humorous—which debuted in late summer, 1953.  According to the album liner notes, the song was "derived from an old ballad", rewritten by Alan Mills, and passed to Ives by Edith Fowke of CBC Radio.  The 1961 illustrated book by Rose Bonne also indicates that the lyrics are hers, whereas the music was composed by Alan Mills.

Lyrics
The following is one version of the lyrics to demonstrate the song's cumulative nature:

In other media

 Pete Seeger released a version on the Birds Bugs and Little Fishes LP (Folkways Records FC7610) in 1955.
 In 1956, composer Alan Mills recorded a version for Scholastic Records released on his children's album Animals, Vol.1.
 In 1964, the National Film Board of Canada released the award-winning 5-minute cartoon I Know an Old Lady Who Swallowed a Fly, directed by Derek Lamb.
 Meredith Tax used this poetic form in her 1970 feminist poem There Was a Young Woman Who Swallowed a Lie, in which the woman finally "throws up" the lies she swallowed. Pete Seeger performed the work during a 1980 concert at the Sanders Theater in Boston.
 In 1973, illustrator Pam Adams used the song and its title as the basis of a children's book.
 The song was performed by Judy Collins and Statler and Waldorf with shadow puppets, on a 1977 episode of The Muppet Show.
 San Francisco-based punk rock band Flipper included a version of "The Old Lady Who Swallowed A Fly" on their 1988 compilation album Sex Bomb Baby.
 In 1997, the song's lyrics were used as the text of a children's book by Simms Taback.

See also

Chad Gadya, another cumulative song example.
The Twelve Days of Christmas (song)

References

External links
 . Compilation containing the Judy Collins 1977 episode of ''The Muppet Show.

English children's songs
Traditional children's songs
American picture books
Cumulative songs
Songs about insects
Fictional flies
1961 children's books